Pensando a te (Italian for 'Thinking of you') is a 1969 Italian "musicarello" film directed by Aldo Grimaldi and starring Al Bano and Romina Power.

Cast 

 Romina Power as  Livia
Al Bano as  Carlo 
 Helene Ronee as The English Teacher
 Nino Taranto as  Filippo Leccisi
  Antonella Steni as  Antonella Pugliesi
 Yvonne Sanson as  Livia's Mother
 Riccardo Garrone as Livia's Father
 Francesco Mulé as Commendator Aldini the undertaker
 Roger Mattson as Fabrizio
Isabella Biagini as  Bernarda 
 Marina Pagano  as Giuliana
Paolo Villaggio as Traffic Cop Filini 
 Rosita Pisano as Santina 
Nino Terzo

References

External links

Musicarelli
1969 musical comedy films
Films directed by Aldo Grimaldi
1969 films
1960s Italian-language films
1960s Italian films